Chlosyne endeis, known generally as the banded checkerspot or banded patch, is a species of crescents, checkerspots, anglewings, etc. in the butterfly family Nymphalidae. It is found in North America.

The MONA or Hodges number for Chlosyne endeis is 4501.

Subspecies
These two subspecies belong to the species Chlosyne endeis:
 Chlosyne endeis endeis
 Chlosyne endeis pardelina Scott, 1986

References

Further reading

 

endeis
Articles created by Qbugbot